Bankova may refer to:

 Bankova Street in Kyiv, Ukraine 
 The Bankova: the Presidential Administration of Ukraine, whose offices are located on Bankova Street